UB9 may refer to:

 UB9, a postcode district in the UB postcode area
 SM UB-9, World War I German submarine